Michael Stanley Veitch (born 19 December 1962) is an Australian politician and Labor Party member of the New South Wales Legislative Council. Veitch has been a member of the Council since 24 March 2007.

Early life
Veitch was born at Gundagai, New South Wales to parents Bob and Val. He is the oldest of five children. He attended Adelong Central School in his primary school years. His secondary studies were undertaken at Tumut High School.

Early career
Leaving high school, he worked as a shearer,  a train station assistant and a disability worker. He finished his railway career as an Assistant Station Master at Rydalmere and Toongabbie train stations. He completed further studies at TAFE. He became the Executive Officer of the Wiradjuri Country Community Group Limited and then the General Manager (Growth and Strategy) of Job Centre Australia Limited.

Political career
He joined the Labor Party in March 1989 He became the Secretary of the Young Branch of the Labor Party. He has been a delegate to the NSW ALP State Conference and the National Conference.

He was elected as an independent shire councillor for Young Shire Council in September 1995.  He was re-elected in 1999 and 2004.

In 1998, he ran as the Labor Party candidate for the federal seat of Hume (a Liberal/National coalition safe seat). He was unsuccessful in that campaign, losing to Liberal Party candidate Alby Schultz.

Veitch was deputy chair of the nine-member Southern Area Health Board for New South Wales.

Veitch was elected on 24 March 2007 to the New South Wales Legislative Council with the 19th-highest quota at that election. He has served as Deputy Government Whip, Parliamentary Secretary for Primary Industries and on numerous Legislative Council Committees. Since 2011 he has served on the Opposition front bench holding responsibility for Trade and Investment, Regional Infrastructure and Services and Regional and Rural Affairs. He is currently the Shadow Minister for Primary Industries, Lands and Western NSW.
At the 2022 NSW Labor Conference, he was disendorsed for the upcoming 2023 state election.

Personal life
He is divorced and has four children, and six grandchildren. He and his former wife were foster parents.

Notes

References

1962 births
Living people
Members of the New South Wales Legislative Council
Australian Labor Party members of the Parliament of New South Wales
21st-century Australian politicians